Mazıdağı District is a district of Mardin Province in Turkey which has the town of Mazıdağı as its seat. The district had a population of 36,773 in 2021.

Creation 
According to the 2012 Metropolitan Municipalities Law (Law No. 6360), all Turkish provinces with a population more than 750,000 will become metropolitan municipalities and the districts within the metropolitan municipalities  will be second-level municipalities. The law also created new districts within the provinces in addition to current districts.

Settlements 
The district encompasses fifty-three neighborhoods of which four form the city of Mazıdağı.

Center neighborhoods 

 Gündoğan
 Karşıyaka
 Kayalar
 Poyraz

Rural neighborhoods 

 Aksu
 Arıköy
 Arısu
 Aşağıocak
 Atalar
 Atlıca 
 Aykut
 Bahçecik
 Balpınar
 Bilge
 Çankaya
 Çayönü
 Derecik
 Dikyamaç
 Duraklı
 Ekinciler
 Enginköy
 Erdalı
 Evciler
 Gümüşpınar
 Gümüşyuva
 Gürgöze
 Işıkyaka
 İkisu
 Karaalanı
 Karataş
 Kebapçı
 Kemerli
 Kışlak
 Kocakent
 Konur
 Meşeli
 Ortaklı
 Ömürlü
 Sağmal
 Sakızlı
 Şanlı
 Şenyuva
 Tanrıyolu
 Tarlacık
 Ulutaş
 Ürünlü
 Yağmur
 Yalınağaç
 Yeşilköy
 Yetkinler
 Yukarıkonak
 Yukarıocak
 Yücebağ

References 

Districts of Mardin Province